Huns within our gates (1918) is a silent World War I propaganda film, starring Derwent Hall Caine and Valda Valkyrien. Produced by the Arrow Film Corporation, the cast, characters and plot were used in The Crusher (1917). After being re-edited the film was re-released as Commercial Pirates in March 1919. Also known as The Hearts of Men.

Cast
 Derwent Hall Caine as Arthur Morgan
 Valda Valkyrien as Dorothy Waring
 Harry Robinson as Judge Morgan
 Robin Townley as Eli Brown
 Bessie Wharton as Countess Von Shoenburg

Plot
Arthur Morgan, son of an old Southern family is engaged in perfecting an aeroplane engine designed to revolutionize the air science. He is handicapped by the impoverishment of his family. Their wealth was buried during the Civil War, and has never been discovered. The Prussian agents seek to trade upon his poverty to buy his invention, but he refuses to sell, and an effort to bomb the inventor and his plane is frustrated by the action of a pet dog, which carries the bomb away from the workshop and drops it, killing the spy, and disclosing the long buried treasure.

Status
This film is lost

References

External links

1918 films
American black-and-white films
American silent films
American World War I propaganda films
Lost American films
Arrow Film Corporation films
1910s American films